David Nyvall (January 19, 1863 – February 6, 1946) was a Swedish immigrant to the United States and church leader who helped shape the Evangelical Covenant Church and establish North Park University in Chicago.

Background
Nyvall was born in Sweden, the son of a colporteur and leader of the Covenant Movement in Sweden.  He immigrated to America in 1886 at age 23; he settled in Illinois and became involved in the nascent denomination in the States.  Though his educational background was pre-med, he accepted an offer from E. August Skogsbergh  (1850-1939) offer to teach at his school in Minneapolis, Minnesota.  In 1887 he married Skogsbergh's sister Louise and served a year as pastor to a church in Sioux City, Iowa.

Career
The next year he began teaching in the Swedish department of the Chicago Theological Seminary, which at the time provided the theological education of many Covenant pastors. Nyvall felt strongly that the Covenant should have its own school.  Acting on this conviction, he resigned from the Chicago Theological Seminary and returned to Skogsbergh's Minneapolis school, which the Covenant had recently accepted as the denomination's school.  Three years later this school was moved to Chicago and North Park College was established, a decision that upset some, including Nyvall's brother-in-law, Skogsbergh.

North Park
Nyvall served as president of North Park and professor of New Testament in the Seminary.  Under his leadership and guidance, the school survived struggles and grew in both enrollment and endowment.  Largely as a result of criticism and disagreement about the infamous Gold money, Nyvall resigned as president and professor in 1904 and left the school the following year.

1905–1912
In his absence, he served as the first president of Walden College in McPherson, Kansas.  In 1907 he returned to Sweden and the following year he took up residence in Minneapolis where he edited the early Covenant periodical Veckoblad. He also established the department of Scandinavian Studies at the University of Washington and served as professor from 1910 until 1912.

Return to North Park
In January 1912, Nyvall accepted to Covenant's call to resume his position at North Park, and returned as president of the school, a position he held until 1923. After 1923, Nyvall continued to serve North Park and the Covenant by acting as dean of the Seminary and teacher until 1941.

Legacy
The main seminary building, Nyvall hall, bears his name. His understanding of Christian education, specifically Covenant Education, is still normative and formative at North Park University. The David Nyvall lecture series was inaugurated in 1951 in memory of the pioneer Swedish American educator who served the school both as teacher and president.

References

Other sources
 Carlson, Leland "A History of North Park College" (North Park College and Theological Seminary, 1941)
 Erickson, Scott E. David Nyvall & the Shape of an Immigrant Church (Almqvist & Wiksell. 1996)

External links
David Nyvall photograph

Swedish Christian clergy
People from McPherson County, Kansas
People from Chicago
Swedish evangelicals
Swedish emigrants to the United States
1863 births
1946 deaths